Wyclife Kinyamal (born 2 July 1997) is a Kenyan male middle-distance runner who competes in the 800 metres. He won a gold medal at the 2018 Commonwealth Games and holds a personal best of 1:43.12 minutes.

Career
Born in Trans Mara District, he made his first impact regionally at the 2016 East African Junior Athletics Championships, winning the 800 m. He placed third at the Kenyan World Junior trials later that year, thus was not picked for the national team. He had initially just focused on the high jump and took up running when he had completed high school at Mogonga Secondary School.

Kinyamal established himself as an elite level runner in the 2017 season with performances on the European track circuit. At the FBK Games he set a personal best of 1:45.65 minutes to place second behind Thijmen Kupers, then won the Palio Città della Quercia in a meeting record of 1:43.94 minutes. The latter performance ranked him seventh in the world on time for that season.

The following year he set an indoor best of 1:46.54 minutes as runner-up at the PSD Bank Meeting. With a second place finish at the Kenyan Commonwealth Games trials, he earned his first senior international selection. At the 2018 Commonwealth Games he defeated defending champion Nijel Amos in the final to become the Commonwealth champion. This was Kenya's first gold medal of the tournament that year, as his compatriots had thus far failed to win any of the distance events in which the country is traditionally strong. In July he improved his PB to 1:43.12 taking third at the Diamond League meeting at London.

International competitions

References

External links

1997 births
Living people
People from Narok County
Kenyan male middle-distance runners
Commonwealth Games gold medallists for Kenya
Commonwealth Games medallists in athletics
Athletes (track and field) at the 2018 Commonwealth Games
Commonwealth Games gold medallists in athletics
21st-century Kenyan people
Medallists at the 2018 Commonwealth Games
Medallists at the 2022 Commonwealth Games